Whitewashing is a casting practice in the film industry in which white actors are cast in non-white roles. As defined by Merriam-Webster, to whitewash is "to alter...in a way that favors, features, or caters to white people: such as...casting a white performer in a role based on a nonwhite person or fictional character." According to the BBC, films in which white actors have played other races include all genres. African-American roles and roles of Asian descent have been whitewashed, as well as characters from the ancient world in the genre of classical and mythological films.

History 
In the early 20th century, white actors caricatured different ethnicities by blackface or yellowface, commonly exaggerating the perceived stereotypes of other ethnicities. For example, Swedish-born actor Warner Oland played the Chinese detective Charlie Chan in Charlie Chan Carries On (1931) and subsequent films. Because of the lack of characters of color in the film industry, these roles were well received at the time by viewers. Other non-Asian actors to portray Chinese detective Charlie Chan include Manuel Arbó, Sidney Toler, Roland Winters, Ross Martin, and Peter Ustinov.

There was a greater color diversity in film by the mid-20th-century and blackface mostly disappeared from the industry. The film Othello (1965) was an exception, as the white actor Laurence Olivier was cast as "the Moor". He wore blackface as the title character. In Soul Man and Tropic Thunder, white actors portray white characters that use blackface.

The practice of "yellowface" extended into the 1960s. For instance, Mickey Rooney played a Japanese landlord in Breakfast at Tiffany's (1961). Professor David A. Schlossman said of Asian characters in particular, "Many of the Asian roles portrayed by White actors also contributed to the pantheon of cultural stereotypes in US national discourse." At the start of the 21st century, minorities were still under-represented in the film industry at different stages. While historically black roles are now generally cast with black actors, the practice of whitewashing applied to other minorities.

Guy Aoki said African Americans "have long felt the full brunt of the 'whitewashing' of roles" and that Asians have experienced it as well. Native Americans have also had their historic leaders and warriors portrayed by whites.

Role of executives 
The BBC said in 2015, "The practice of casting white actors in non-white roles is still prevalent in Hollywood – despite widespread condemnation and protest." A report in 2013 showed that 94% of film executives were white and that non-white people were under-represented as filmmakers and actors. The BBC explored two reasons for the casting practice: institutional racism and a belief that well-known white actors attract more audiences and maximize profits. Tom Rothman, the chairman of the Sony Pictures Motion Picture Group said, "I guess there's a certain institutional force and memory that exists out there.... I think the industry's improving but I certainly agree with those who say we haven't come far enough fast enough."

Jeffery Mio, author of Multicultural Psychology: Understanding Our Diverse Communities, hypothesizes that the film industry, mostly white, hires people of similar backgrounds. Mio said of the rationale that only the most qualified actors are cast, "That's the argument that directors and casting directors make, but a lot of times ethnic actors will tell us that when they say we're just choosing the best actor, they mean we're choosing our friends, or people we're used to." Craig Detweiler, professor of film history at Pepperdine University, said, "There are a shortage  of African American, Asian and Latino stars. For all Hollywood's progressive politics, its casting decisions look remarkably retrograde." In 2010, TheWrap ascribed the lack of racial diversity to institutional racism and a lack of bankable actors of color and that whitewashing in films like Prince of Persia: The Sands of Time and The Last Airbender aggravated the issue.

Business aspect 
On casting white actors to maximize profits, David White, National Executive Director of the actors' union SAG-AFTRA said popular black actors such as Will Smith, Denzel Washington, and David Oyelowo refuted the casting rationale. Assistant professor of telecommunications Andrew J. Weaver said, "There is an assumption in Hollywood that whites would avoid movies with majority black casts, or any race cast for that matter. You see this whitewashing of films – even films that have minority characters written into them are being cast with whites." Film professor Mitchell W. Block said studios adhered to casting norms as a matter of practicing business to appeal to investors and producers.

Director Ridley Scott said without the casting of big-name actors, his 2014 biblical epic film Exodus: Gods and Kings would never have been made, saying, "I can't mount a film of this budget... and say that my lead actor is Mohammad so-and-so from such-and-such.... I'm just not going to get financed." USA Today noted with films like Breakfast at Tiffany's (1961), A Mighty Heart (2007), and Pan (2015), "White actors continue to be top of mind for plum roles, despite the under-representation of people of color at the acting, directing and producing levels."

Anti-whitewashing campaigns 
Media watchdog groups have sought more authentic representations on screen, taking issue with casting decisions such as actor Johnny Depp as a Native American in The Lone Ranger (2013). With films from the United States receiving promotion in more global markets, the groups argue for roles that represent the diversity of audiences, who are seeking more authenticity. SAG-AFTRA's David White demurred on groups' opposition to casting white actors in non-white roles, "The laws insist that one's race not be part of the qualifications for a job," but he recognized that there was a lack of diversity in roles available. Law professor John Tehranian said, "Of course, there is nothing inherently wrong with race-blind casting, as long as it works both ways. But in reality, it never has; one rarely sees, for example, an African American, Latino, or Asian actor cast as a white character." However, certainly in Shakespeare plays, black actors have been cast in white roles for some time: see for example the 2022 production of Richard III with Danai Gurira. Various modern Marvel, Disney and DC characters have "race-swapped" traditionally white portrayed characters in "an effort to appeal to modern audiences": Heimdall in Thor, Valkyrie, Hawkman High Evolutionary, Iris & Wally West, Jimmy Olsen, Ariel, Batgirl, Commissioner Gordon, Invincible Amber, Nick Fury, Fairy God Mother, Johnny Storm, Peter Pan, Tinkerbell, Aquaman, Snow White, Spiderman, MJ, Johnny storm, Perry White, Harvey Dent, Deadshot, Alicia Masters, Kingpin, Emil, Hogun, Iris West, Electro, Baron Mardo, Callisto, Manchester Black, Starfire amongst others. Alterman describes this modern trend, and historic race swapping, as being neither a "liberal" or "racist agenda" but a "green agenda" to make the most money appealing to the widest paying demographic. Once, that was almost entirely a white market, but increasingly it is a diverse market and requires a diverse portfolio of actors.

Examples of associated cases 
Below is a list of some of the films that have had their casting criticized as whitewashing:

Examples of whitewashing experiences in pre-production 
Ed Skrein was initially cast in the 2019 Hellboy movie as Major Ben Daimio, an Asian character from the Hellboy comic books. After the casting received criticism on social media, Skrein withdrew from the film, stating, "Representation of ethnic diversity is important, especially to me as I have a mixed heritage family. It is our responsibility to make moral decisions in difficult times and to give voice to inclusivity." According to The Hollywood Reporter, "this is the first time an actor has exited such a high-profile project in response to public criticism" over whitewashing. Daniel Dae Kim was cast to replace Skrein.

The director and producers of The Paper Tigers planned to have a male Asian-American main character with a minority leading cast for their martial arts comedy film. They knew that it would be difficult to find studio support for the film due to whitewashing. When the film project was pitched to Hollywood producers, they were offered $4 million with a caveat that there would be no Asian lead character and suggested a white lead character to be played by Bruce Willis instead. They were also asked to write a role for Nicolas Cage. The team declined the offer and request. The director, Bao Tran, mentioned that Hollywood usually sent their mid-level executives who were also people of color to be the messengers of whitewashing. The team turned to Kickstarter and a few local investors to crowdfund their movie instead and stayed true to their vision.

Lulu Wang, the director of The Farewell, also faced whitewashing obstacles with her film about a Chinese-American family. She mentioned that many disheartening encounters with American financiers who wanted to include a "prominent white character into the narrative, and punch up the nuanced drama to turn it into a broad comedy." Wang later created an episode on This American Life based on her family's life, which caught the attention of producer Chris Weitz who helped secure financing for the film.

Justin Lin, director of Better Luck Tomorrow, revealed that he was told by potential investors - many of whom were Asian Americans - to add a white male lead, Macaulay Culkin, if he wanted million dollar investment for his movie, which was based on an Asian American story. Lin turned down the offer. MC Hammer funded the movie instead and Lin was very grateful for his generosity.

The writers of Harold & Kumar Go to White Castle, Jon Hurwitz and Hayden Schlossberg, said that they were really sick of seeing teen movies that were one-dimensional and that had characters that did not match the diversity of their group of friends. Because the main characters were Asian American, they had difficulty pitching their screenplay to studios. John Cho, who played the lead character Harold Lee, stated that, to avoid studios’ attempt to cast white actors, the writers included scenes that directly related to the characters’ ethnicities. Cho recalled, “It had to be rooted in that as a defense mechanism so that they wouldn’t get turned white.”

Salma Hayek stated that she was passed over for two large comedy roles due to her ethnicity. While the directors thought Hayek was the best actress for those roles, they believed studios would not want a Mexican lead at time. The directors later said that they regretted their decision and that Hayek’s audition was better than who they cast for the movies. She also mentioned that producers of the 1993 film, The House of the Spirits, did not want to cast Latinos outside of stereotypical roles. Hayek asserted that she was denied even a chance to audition for the film because “they were not hiring Latinos for Latino roles. They were not hiring Latinos period — unless it was the maid or the prostitute. And that part was not a maid or a prostitute."

See also 

Color-blind casting
Racebending
White savior narrative in film
Straightwashing
Racism in horror films
Blackwashing in film
Film adaptations of Twenty Thousand Leagues Under the Sea, in which Captain Nemo has often been cast as European rather than as an Indian prince.
Tokenism

References

Bibliography 

Whitewashing
Cultural appropriation
Ethnic and racial stereotypes
History of racism in the cinema of the United States
Race-related controversies in film
White (human racial classification)